Barwar Christian Neo-Aramaic is a dialect of Northeastern Neo-Aramaic spoken by ethnic Assyrians in the Barwari region.

Phonology

References

Sources

Christian Northeastern Neo-Aramaic dialects